Easton Glacier is one of the more prominent alpine glaciers on Mount Baker in the North Cascades of Washington state, United States. Named for Charles F. Easton of Bellingham, who did much to preserve the history of Mount Baker, it is positioned on the south face of the mountain and flanked by Squak and Deming Glaciers.

The glacier has created two very clear lateral moraines, the left being Metcaife Moraine and the right Railroad Grade. Evidence of the glacier's movement can clearly be seen on the valley floor. Many of the andesite outcrops and boulders have been polished, and glacial striations are easily visible.

Between 1850 and 1950, Easton Glacier retreated . During a cooler and wetter period from 1950 to 1979, the glacier advanced  but between 1980 and 2006 retreated back .

See also 
List of glaciers in the United States

References

External links 
Easton Glacier Changes Through Time Photo Gallery

Glaciers of Mount Baker
Glaciers of Washington (state)